Drug Delivery is a peer-reviewed open access medical journal covering research on all aspects of drug delivery, a core aspect of drug development. It is published by Taylor & Francis and since 2009 the editor-in-chief is Vladimir Torchilin. Alfred Stracher was the founder and co-editor prior to his passing in 2013. According to the Journal Citation Reports, the journal has a 2018 impact factor of 3.095.

References

External links

Publications established in 1991
Pharmacology journals
9 times per year journals